The 2003–04 Thai Premier League had 10 teams. Two clubs would be relegated and 2 teams promoted from Thailand Division 1 League. The team that finished in 8th position would play in a relegation play-off.

Member clubs

Bangkok Bank
Bangkok University (promoted from Division 1)
BEC Tero Sasana
Sinthana
Krung Thai Bank
Osotsapa M-150
Port Authority of Thailand
Royal Thai Air Force
Royal Thai Navy (promoted from Division 1)
Thailand Tobacco Monopoly

Final league table

Queen's Cup

Osotsapa FC again won the Queen's Cup. This was their third success in a row.

Asian Representation

  Again in another revamped and expanded Asian Champions League, last years runners up BEC Tero Sasana met their match and came bottom of a tough group comprising sides from China, South Korea and Japan. Krung Thai Bank also entered this year and came in second place in their group, although still not good enough to qualify for the knockout stages.

Annual awards

Coach of the Year

 Worrawoot Dangsamer - Krung Thai Bank

Player of the year

 Pichitphong Choeichiu - Krung Thai Bank

Top scorer

 Vimol Jankam - 14 Goals Osotsapa M 150

Champions
The league champion was Krung Thai Bank. It was the second time the team won the title.

References
Notes

Sources
Thailand 2003/04 RSSSF

External links
Official Website

Thai League, 2003-04
1
1
Thai League 1 seasons